Le stagioni del cuore  is an Italian television series.

See also
List of Italian television series

External links
 

Italian television series
2004 Italian television series debuts
2004 Italian television series endings
Canale 5 original programming